Lund is a borough and district in the city of Kristiansand which lies in the municipality of Kristiansand in Agder county, Norway. It is the second largest borough in the city after Vågsbygd. In 2015, the population was about 30,000. Lund is divided into 4 districts: Lund (centrum), Gimlekollen, Justvik, and Ålefjær.

Lund lies to the north and west of Topdalsfjorden-Ålefjærfjorden and to the East of the river Otra.  The borough of Oddernes lies to the east and the boroughs of Kvadraturen and Grim lie to the west. North of the borough is the municipality of Vennesla.

The University of Agder is located at Lund along with Kristiansand Cathedral School.

The Church of Norway has three churches in Lund: Lund Church, Justvik Church, and Oddernes Church. Oddernes Church was one of the first churches to be built in Kristiansand.

There are three bridges connecting Lund to the city center Kvadraturen: "Lundsbroa", "Oddernesbrua" and "Christian Quartbroa". Before Oddernesbrua was built, the Lundsbroa was the main way to the east. Today, the Oddernesbrua is a part of the European route E18 highway, and the bridge ends in a tunnel. The Lundsbroa is a part of Fylkesvei 471, which eventually joins up with the E18. The recently opened Christian Quartbroa footbridge is located between the other two bridge connections.

Public transportation is available by bus, all local buses headed eastbound have more than one stop at Lund. There are also buses that go "deeper" into Lund. Line 13 Grimsmyra-Lund goes to Kuholmen in Lund, a place south of Lund, while Line 19 Suldalen-Lund UiA, follows Riksvei 471 to the University.

Divisions of the borough

Districts

Neighborhoods

Education

Religion

Lund Church is a church at Valhalla in the Lund district. The church has a capacity of 600 people and there is no graveyard with the church. It opened in 1987 and is built out of bricks.

Oddernes Church is located with Oddemarka and the university. It was built when Lund was a part of the former municipality Oddernes, which today is a borough in the city. Even though Oddernes church is not located at Oddenres, it has kept the name such as other landmarks around the city where Oddernes used to be. The church was built in 1630 but a new roof was built in 1788. The church has a capacity of 510 people and there is a graveyard located with the church. It was built by bricks and stone and is the oldest building in Kristiansand.

Justvik Church has a capacity of 270 people and was built in 1996 with no graveyard with the church.

Transportation

Road
European route E18 is the main road and is a highway. While other roads like County Road 471 goes from the University to downtown Kristiansand. As for County Road 1 goes from Vennesla and ends in Lund centrum. County Road 1 goes next to Otra river.

Bus

Media gallery

References

Geography of Kristiansand
Boroughs of Kristiansand
Populated places in Agder